Aberfan railway station served the village of Aberfan, near Merthyr Tydfil in Wales. Opened by the Quakers Yard & Merthyr Railway, a joint Great Western Railway / Rhymney Railway Joint  operation, it became part of the Great Western Railway during the Grouping of 1923. Passing on to the Western Region of British Railways on nationalisation in 1948, it was closed to passengers in 1951.

The site today
The railway station now has a new housing estate built on it in 2018

The site is now on the route of the Taff Trail. Aberfan is served by the Valley Lines station at Merthyr Vale, across the river.

References 

 Aberfan station on navigable O. S. map

Disused railway stations in Merthyr Tydfil County Borough
Former Great Western Railway stations
Railway stations in Great Britain opened in 1886
Railway stations in Great Britain closed in 1951